American Stores Company was an American public corporation and a holding company which ran chains of supermarkets and drugstores in the United States from 1917 through 1998. The company was incorporated in 1917 when The Acme Tea Company merged with four small Philadelphia-area grocery stores (Childs, George Dunlap, Bell Company, and A House That Quality Built) to form American Stores. In the following eight decades, the company would expand to 1,575 food and drugstores in 38 states with $20 billion in annual sales in 1998.

History
By 1925, American Stores had grown from five supermarkets in 1917 to nearly 1,800 stores. In 1946, a proposed acquisition of Grand Union supermarkets was turned down by Grand Union stockholders.

1960s-1970s
In 1961, American Stores company acquired California's Alpha Beta chain of supermarkets. In the 1970s, in order to compete with lower priced grocery retailers such as ShopRite and Pathmark (competitors which did not offer trading stamps), Acme Markets launched its Super Saver discount grocery chain in Pennsylvania.

American Stores itself was acquired in 1979 by the Skaggs Companies, Inc., which adopted the American Stores Company name, and relocated the company headquarters to Salt Lake City, Utah.

American Stores was by far the larger organization, with 758 supermarkets, 139 drugstores, 53 restaurants, and 9 general merchandise stores in nine states when compared to the 241 Skaggs stores. Although the resulting entity bore the American Stores Company name, it was controlled by Skaggs management headed by Leonard S. Skaggs Jr. more familiarly known as Sam Skaggs. Stores in several markets having both an Alpha Beta supermarket and a Skaggs Drug Center drugstore presence were combined (or expanded) to combination food and drug stores and re-branded Skaggs Alpha Beta.
 In 1977, the Skaggs Companies, Inc. had amicably dissolved a partnership started in 1969 with the Albertsons supermarket chain which pioneered the first combination grocery/drug with stores named Skaggs Albertsons.

1980s
American Stores posted $83 million in earnings on sales of nearly $8 billion in 1983. But its presence was still weak in the midwest, New England, and Florida. To help overcome these remaining geographical shortcomings, Sam Skaggs made another attempt to merge with the Jewel Companies, Inc. in 1984.
 In 1978, Skaggs Companies, Inc., originally had worked out an agreement to merge with Jewel Companies Inc., but the merger was torpedoed at the last minute when some of Skaggs's directors, concerned that they would lose their autonomy under the deal, failed to approve it.

Acquisition of the Jewel Companies
The Jewel Companies, Inc. chairman Weston Christopherson was opposed to a merger and Sam Skaggs was forced to engineer a hostile takeover. On June 1, 1984, American Stores tendered an offer worth $1.1 billion for 67 percent of Jewel's outstanding shares at $70 per share.

For two weeks, the Jewel Companies, Inc. management refused all comment on the offer, maintaining its silence even at a stormy shareholder's meeting before which Jewel shareholder groups controlling 20 percent of the company's stock had come out in favor of negotiating with American Stores. Finally, on June 14, Sam Skaggs and Jewel president Richard Cline reached an agreement after an all-night bargaining session. American Stores raised its bid for Jewel's preferred stock, increasing the total bid to $1.15 billion in cash and securities. In return, Jewel dropped plans for a defensive acquisition of Household International Inc. and accepted American Stores' offer. To help raise cash for the deal, American Stores sold its Rea and Derick, Inc. subsidiary comprising 134 drugstores in December 1984 to People's Drug, a division of Imasco Limited. 33 Alpha Beta grocery stores in Arizona sold to ABCO Foods, 22 Alpha Beta grocery stores and support facilities in northern California were also sold.

The acquisition of the Jewel Companies, Inc. consisted of the Illinois-based Jewel Food Stores supermarket chain, Illinois-based Osco Drug, Inc., Massachusetts-based Star Market, California-based Sav-on Drugs, Montana-based Buttrey Food Stores, and White Hen. This acquisition also returned L. L. Skaggs's Osco Drug chain to the Skaggs family ownership. And Sav-on Drugs, another Jewel Companies subsidiary, had been founded by C.J. Call, who had once been a business partner of another of Sam Skaggs's uncles, O.P. Skaggs.

This merger added 193 supermarkets, 358 drugstores, 140 combination food and drug stores, 301 convenience stores, and 132 discount stores to American Stores' holdings. But in 1985, the company found itself in legal trouble through its new subsidiary. A salmonella food-poisoning outbreak affecting some 20,000 people in the midwest was traced to Jewel's Hillfarm Dairy that had supplied tainted milk to Jewel stores in March and April 1985. In 1987, Jewel was found not liable for punitive damages in Illinois Cook County Circuit Court but agreed to pay compensatory damages estimated at $35 to $40 million.

In 1985, American Stores sold the White Hen chain, since convenience stores did not fit into the company's plans. Buttrey Food & Drug and Star Market were put up for sale in order to raise capital and pay down debt. Although the company continued to operate these subsidiaries, investment in remodeling and new construction for these stores and for Acme Markets was minimal throughout the 1980s.

By 1987, American Stores Company was the largest drug retailer in the United States, but only the third-largest grocery retailer and underperforming its peers. In October 1987, the company exited the Idaho and Washington drugstore markets with the sale of 25 Osco Drug units to Pay Less Drug Stores.

Acquisition of Lucky Stores
In March 1988, American Stores made an unsolicited tender offer for Lucky Stores, an Alpha Beta competitor noted for high efficiency and low prices. American Stores’ Alpha Beta chain in California was struggling, plagued by high prices and a reputation for poor service. At the time, Lucky was California's leading grocery retailer, due in part that it was the only chain with a significant presence in both northern California and southern California. Lucky refused American Stores' first offer. Within a month, American Stores proposed to up its bid if Lucky would agree to a friendly takeover. Again Lucky management rejected the offer as inadequate and was said to be contemplating defensive strategies. Later, American Stores upped its bid to $2.5 billion, or $65 per share. Lucky accepted and American Stores was on track to become the largest supermarket chain in the United States, over the Kroger and Safeway chains.

The acquisition included then Dublin, California-based Lucky Stores, with stores in California, Nevada, and Arizona; Tampa-based Kash n' Karry, with stores in Florida; and a minority interest in Milan, Illinois-based Eagle Food Centers.

In August 1988, California Attorney General John Van de Kamp asked the Federal Trade Commission to void the sale, claiming that a Lucky-Alpha Beta juggernaut would cost California consumers $400 million by reducing competition. The Federal Trade Commission refused but did force the divestiture of 37 Alpha Beta stores, which were sold in December 1988, the same month 38 Lucky stores in Arizona were also sold. Van de Kamp then initiated a lawsuit against American Stores under the Clayton Antitrust Act, and on September 1988, a federal judge in Los Angeles issued a preliminary injunction against the merger. American Stores appealed, and in April 1989, a Ninth Circuit panel in San Francisco overturned the injunction. Van de Kamp appealed this reversal to the U.S. Supreme Court.  Meanwhile, American Stores continued to plan its integration of Lucky while it waited for the district court to lift the injunction as ordered by the Ninth Circuit.

However, on August 22, 1989, Associate Justice Sandra Day O'Connor, in her capacity as Circuit Justice for the Ninth Circuit, issued an interlocutory order staying the Ninth Circuit's issuance of its mandate back to the district court, which kept the preliminary injunction in place while the parties briefed the issues before the high court.  After oral argument on January 19, the U.S. Supreme Court issued a unanimous decision on April 30, 1990 (although Justice Anthony Kennedy filed a concurring opinion separately from Justice John Paul Stevens' opinion for the Court) in favor of the state of California.  The Court ruled that the words "injunctive relief" in Section 16 of the Clayton Act impliedly included the power to force divestiture of assets in order to ameliorate harm to the market from an anticompetitive merger.

Wishing to avoid additional lengthy litigation, the following month American Stores reached an agreement with Van de Kamp whereby the company was allowed to convert 14 Alpha Beta stores to the Lucky name but also had to sell 161 southern California stores (152 Alpha Beta stores and 9 Lucky stores) within 5 years. The deal put no restrictions on American Stores' future growth in California and did not require state approval of the buyer or terms of the sale.

In 1989, Kash n' Karry was acquired by its management from American Stores for $305 million. American Stores also sold the minority interest in Eagle Food Centers that it had acquired from Lucky and sold it to New York-based Odyssey Partners.

Headquarters move to Southern California
Based on a recommendation by Booz-Allen, American Stores relocated its corporate headquarters from Salt Lake City to Irvine, California, in July 1988. At the time, the company indicated the reason for the move was to place the headquarters in one of the company's major operating market areas and therefore closer to its business interests. However, the corporate headquarters was moved back to Salt Lake City in 1989 with little explanation.

Sav-on Name Change
American Stores plans to build a coast-to-coast drugstore chain in the United States were underway. The strategy was to build a nationwide network of pharmacies, streamline operations and advertising in order to gain national recognition for the brand, especially for the high-margin private label products. The name Osco Drug was chosen as the national chain banner because of the large number of stores which already had that name and existed in various parts of the United States. The name change was completed for the Skaggs drugstores in 1985 and then for the Sav-on stores in 1986. 

The name 'Osco' did not resonate well with Sav-on's southern California customer base. American Stores eventually made the decision to change the name of the former Sav-on stores back to Sav-on Drugs. Rumors circulated at the time claiming that the reason for the name change back to 'Sav-on' was due to 'Osco' having the same pronunciation as the Spanish word 'asco' (oss-ko) which means disgust or loathing, a considerable factor within southern California’s heavily Hispanic market. This explanation for the name change was refuted by American Stores.
The name change on all stores was completed in 1989 and the Sav-on Drugs brand was re-launched in southern California and Nevada.

American Drug Stores, Inc.
In 1989, a new subsidiary American Drug Stores, Inc. was formed and consisted of American Stores drugstore holdings of Osco Drug, Sav-on Drugs, the Osco side of the Jewel-Osco food-drug combination stores and RxAmerica. RxAmerica began earlier in 1989 as a mail service prescription fulfillment center with a facility in Salt Lake City.

Jewel-Osco Florida
On March 16, 1989, the company opened a 75,000-square-foot Jewel-Osco combination store in Largo, Florida. This marked American Stores’ re-entry into the Southeast after an absence of nearly two decades. Mark S. Skaggs, son of Sam Skaggs was president of the new Jewel-Osco of Florida division. This was a wholly separate division of the company and was not part of the Jewel Food Stores chain in the midwest or the Osco/American Drug Stores subsidiary. Unlike the combination stores in the midwest, where Jewel ran the food side of the combination stores and Osco ran the drug side, the Florida stores were run by a one overall manager, similar to the way a Skaggs Alpha Beta store was managed. Only six Jewel-Osco stores were opened in Florida and all were sold to Albertsons in 1992.

1990s
In the early 1990s, reducing the $3.4 billion in debt load became the prime challenge for the company; doing so was mainly accomplished through asset sales. By the end of fiscal 1992, long term debt was down from $3.4 billion to $2.1 billion.

Divestitures
In the early 1990s, American Stores divestitures included:
 October 1990: 44 Buttrey Food & Drug stores located in Montana, Wyoming, Washington, Idaho, and North Dakota by a management-led $184 million leveraged buyout.
 June 1991: 51 Osco Drug stores in Colorado, Utah, and Wyoming sold to Pay Less Drug Stores, at that time a division of Kmart Corp., for $60 million.
 June 1991: 152 unit Alpha Beta chain sold to the Yucaipa Companies for $251 million.
 October 1991: 74 newly re-branded and remodeled Texas, Oklahoma, Florida, and Arkansas Jewel-Osco combination stores for $454 million to Albertsons. Earlier in 1991 and prior to the announcement of the sale, American Stores had remodeled and renamed these stores from Skaggs Alpha Beta to Jewel-Osco. The 11 Jewel-Osco New Mexico stores were retained by American Stores and operated as Jewel-Osco Southwest, Inc., a subsidiary separate from the Jewel Food Stores chain in the midwest.
 The company also put its 275 unit ACME Markets chain on the block in early 1991, but shortly thereafter decided not to sell Acme Markets, apparently because the bids received were not deemed sufficient.
 November 1994, the Star Market grocery division, fifth in market share in the Greater Boston area, consisting of 33 food stores in Massachusetts and Rhode Island was sold to Investcorp Bank, an international investment bank for $288 million in cash and the assumption of substantially all of its outstanding liabilities. American Stores deemed Star Market expendable because the company wanted to focus on markets where it held first or second place in market share.
 January 1995, the company sold 45 Acme Markets located in New York and northern Pennsylvania to the Penn Traffic Company for $94 million.

Acquisitions
At the same time that the company was making major divestments in the early 1990s, American Stores also looked for opportunities to make strategic minor acquisitions, ones that would enhance its position in the main markets where it needed to strengthen market share.
 The company's California drugstore operations were enhanced through the early 1992 $60 million purchase of 85 CVS Stores (63 CVS Pharmacy drugstores and the rights to operate 22 CVS health and beauty aid stores) from the Melville Corporation. These stores converted to the Sav-on Drugs and Sav-on Express banners. Later that year, 30 Thrifty and Rx Plus drugstores in Arizona and Nevada were acquired.
 The following year the Midwest region received a boost when Reliable Drug (a 55 unit chain) in Indiana, Illinois, Iowa, Kansas, and Missouri was bought. These stores were soon re-bannered as Osco Drug stores.
 February 1995, American Stores spent about $37 million for 17 Clark Drug stores in southern California, which were then converted to the Sav-on Drugs name.

Transformation into an Operating Company
American Stores had long been run as a decentralized holding company, but in order to compete in the fierce retail environment of the 1990s the company announced plans in 1992 to transform itself into an integrated operating company. As part of this transition, the company also began to centralize company-wide its procurement, warehousing, inventory control, distribution, marketing, payroll and human resources operations. Another aspect of the plan involved the consolidation of the central support organizations of the drugstore and grocery store operations. At the same time, American Stores sought to initiate faster growth, this time primarily through the opening of new stores and not through acquisitions. This ambitious plan to create better efficiencies won a lot of support from investors. The plan, called the Delta Project, was expected to turn American Stores into a more profitable national supermarket company with greater shareholder value by centralizing its buying operations, as well as putting together more food and drugstore combination stores.

From 1992 up through 1998, American Stores consolidated operations and moved major responsibilities of their subsidiaries to their headquarters in Salt Lake City, Utah. The company's employees based in Salt Lake City increased from fewer than 100 in 1992 to over 1,200 by 1998. During this period, American Stores itself did not operate any food or drugstores in Utah having sold-off the Osco Drug and Alpha Beta Utah stores in 1991.

Super Saver Food
In early 1994, American Stores launched a discount warehouse food store concept in California. New store formats were built in Anaheim, Indio, National City, Oceanside and several existing Lucky stores were converted to this warehouse format in Sacramento, Pittsburg, Vacaville, and Woodland. Initially, these stores were named Price Advantage, based on a Lucky Advantage prototype store in Escondido, California. Price Club sued American Stores over name infringement shortly before the grand opening of the stores. The stores were swiftly renamed Food Advantage the night before grand openings, with the word "Price" marked out with a thick ink marker on every label, tag and sign in the store. In the coming months these stores were branded as Food/Price Advantage and finally as Super Saver Food. Super Saver Food was a familiar brand which had been used in the 1970s and early 1980s by Acme for their discount grocery store format in Pennsylvania and was a trademark still owned by American Stores.

Kap's Kitchen and Pantry
In 1997, the company opened Kap's Kitchen and Pantry in Salt Lake City, Utah, a prototype for entry into the high end food retail market with selections of natural and organic products, produce, seafood, grocery, meat and poultry, bakery and prepared foods. The venture was quickly abandoned and the store was closed within a year.

Skaggs Family Exit
In 1994, at the company's annual shareholder meeting, the company board elected Sam Skaggs’ son Don L. Skaggs a director effective October 1, 1994, to fill the position rendered vacant by the resignation of Aline W. Skaggs, wife of Sam Skaggs. Don L. Skaggs was also the Executive Vice President and General Manager of Skaggs Telecommunications Service, Inc. a non-retail subsidiary of American Stores consisting of an audio media production company, a satellite teleport U.S. Satellite Corporation and an operation that sold equipment to law enforcement agencies. Seventy-two-year-old Sam Skaggs relinquished the chairmanship of American Stores to Victor L. Lund in 1995. Skaggs still held an 18.3 percent stake in the company and a seat on the company board, and when he announced in July 1996 that he was exploring options for his stake, speculation about a possible takeover ran wild. The company was not certain if Skaggs’ intention was to launch a proxy fight for control of American Stores or to alter its current management or direction. By February 1997, an agreement was reached between American Stores and Skaggs whereby the company would repurchase about 12.2 million of Skaggs's shares for $550 million, with the remaining shares subsequently to be sold to the public through a secondary offering. This purchase reduced Skaggs’ stake in the company to five percent, insufficient ownership for him and his family members to retain seats on the company's board.

Acquisition by Albertsons
At the company's June 17, 1998, annual meeting of shareholders in Salt Lake City, American Stores highlighted its accomplishments over the past year and its plans for the sustained long-term growth. In his keynote address, chairman and chief executive officer Victor L. Lund said, "During the past year, we have transformed many of our key plans for the future to reality. We are confident that our plan for growth is working and is squarely on track. We've set our sights very high because we know our visions of tomorrow will be achieved".  A day earlier, American Stores had held a ceremony marking the opening of the American Stores Center, its 24 story corporate office building in downtown Salt Lake City, Utah. The building had a company-owned Italian restaurant, Il Sansovino, and a convenience store, The American Store, on the ground level floor.

Six weeks later, on August 3, 1998 it was announced that Albertsons would acquire American Stores for $11.7 billion. Soon after the announcement, the Federal Trade Commission charged that Albertsons' proposed acquisition of American Stores would substantially lessen supermarket competition in California, Nevada, and New Mexico. The proposed acquisition, the FTC charged, could result in higher prices or reduced quality and selection for consumers. As a condition of the sale, Albertsons' and American Stores agreed to sell 144 supermarkets (104 Albertson's supermarkets, 40 American Stores' Lucky supermarkets) in 57 markets in order to resolve. The divestiture agreement, was the largest retail divestiture ever required by the Federal Trade Commission. Due to the mandated sale of stores, the acquisition took nearly a year to complete. In June 1999, the acquisition was complete, ASC was de-listed on the New York Stock Exchange and American Stores ceased to exist.

During 1999, the drugstore operations division and general merchandise procurement functions were moved from Salt Lake City to Scottsdale, Arizona, operating as Albertsons Drug Region. The functions which supported the food divisions were consolidated and moved from Salt Lake City to Albertsons' headquarters in Boise. For a short time after the acquisition of American Stores, Albertsons leased several floors of the American Stores Center building to the International Olympic Committee - Utah had been awarded the 2002 Winter Olympics. The building is now owned by Wells Fargo.

For a very short time after the American Stores acquisition was completed, Albertsons was the largest food/drug chain in the United States operating nearly 2,500 stores in 40 states, until Kroger's acquisition of Fred Meyer completed the following month. Albertsons preserved the Acme Markets, Jewel-Osco, Osco Drug and Sav-on Drugs namesakes. Shortly after the sale, Albertsons rebranded the Lucky stores under the Albertsons name because both chains had stores and overlap in northern and southern California. (The Lucky brand would be revived in 2006 by SuperValu).

References

External links
 
 U.S. Chain Store Timeline
 
 Business Network published: April 3, 1989 Jewel Osco dazzles Tampa with sparkling new format
 
 
 Edgar Online published: April 26, 1995: SEC Filing, filed by AMERICAN STORES CO 
 Edgar Online published: June 21, 1995 American Stores Notice of Annual Meeting of Shareholders
 Business Network published: July 8, 1996 American Stores awaits founder Skaggs' next move
 
 Chain Drug Review published March 17, 1997 Skaggs family to sell its stake in American Stores
 Press Release Newswire: June 17, 1998 American Stores Company Highlights Accomplishments During the Past Year and Vision for the Future
 
 FTC Release: June 22, 1999 Agreement with Albertson's and American Stores Requires Selling of 144 Stores in Order to Preserve Supermarket Competition in California, Nevada and New Mexico

Holding companies established in 1917
Defunct supermarkets of the United States
Skaggs family
Retail companies disestablished in 1999
Retail companies established in 1917
1917 establishments in Pennsylvania
1999 disestablishments in Utah
Holding companies disestablished in 1999